Edayar is a village in the Udayarpalayam taluk of Ariyalur district, Tamil Nadu, India.

Demographics 
 census, Edayar had a total population of 2,899 with 1,432 males and 1,467 females.

References 

Villages in Ariyalur district